Maria Theresa Rosario Garcia Nayve, known by her screen name Rio Locsin (born October 3, 1961), is a Filipino actress. Regarded as the "Queen of Adult Drama", Locsin has starred in nearly 60 films including  Bira! Darna! Bira! (1979), Disgrasyada (1970), Working Girls (1979), Manila By Night (1980) and Si Baning, Si Maymay at ang Asong si Bobo (2009). 

In 2012, Locsin was inducted at the Eastwood City's Walk of Fame for her contribution to Philippine film industry. She was recognized as one of the prominent sex goddesses of the late 70s. As a seasoned actress, Locsin has garnered multiple nominations from FAMAS and Gawad Urian Awards. In 2009, she bagged the "Best Supporting Actress" award at the 5th Cinema One Originals Digital Movie Film Festival. 

As a film actress she has starred in lead roles through the 70’s 80’s and 90’s in the late 90s she starred in Daytime dramas such as Kadenang Kristal and Marinella in 1999-2001 and a recurring cast in Mula Sa Puso (1997-1999)  she ventured in many Primetime Television dramas in 2006, she starred in more Television dramas memorably as Edad in Gulong Ng Palad remake on ABS-CBN and 2007 she starred as a antiheroine in Pangarap Na Bituin in 2007 she starred in the hit tv series Margarita as she ventured away she did more roles then ever. Her public marriage to actor Al Tantay dissolved.

Career
Locsin was launched to stardom in Regal Films' Disgrasyada (1978) which became a huge box-office hit. Since then, she was given roles which are sexy  like Menor de Edad (1979), Love Affair (1979), Ina, Kapatid, Anak (1979), Rissa Jones (1979), Stepsisters (1979), Waikiki (1980), Disco Madhouse (1980), Manila by Night (1980), Unang Yakap (1980), Kambal sa Uma (1980), Kasalanan Ba (1981), among others.

She also had the privilege of transforming to Darna via the low-budgeted, poorly-directed Bira, Darna, Bira (1979) with Romnick Sarmenta as Ding. In 1982, she essayed the role of a ghost in Haplos (1982) playing support to Vilma Santos. Other memorable roles were in movies, Salawahan (1979), Working Girls (1984), Soltero (1984), Kailan Tama ang Mali? (1985), Kapag Puso ang Sinugatan (1985) and Huwag Mo kaming Isumpa (1985).

In 1981 to 1982, she top-billed an afternoon drama show over GMA-7 entitled, Hiyas.

As a commercial model, she endorsed, "San-ing" and "Lyna" medicated products, including Bax jeans during the late 70s until early 80s.

She attended Siena College in Quezon City.

Personal life
She married Al Tantay, but they separated after a few years. She remarried to a former basketball player turned Evangelical Christian pastor, Padim Israel. She has three daughters.

Filmography

Film

Television

References

External links

1961 births
Living people
Filipino female models
Filipino film actresses
Filipino television actresses
Actresses from Quezon
Tagalog people
Filipino Christians
Filipino evangelicals
20th-century Filipino actresses
21st-century Filipino actresses